John Howard Hubbell (1925 – March 31, 2007) was an American radiation physicist born in Ann Arbor, Michigan.  He was on the staff of the National Institute of Standards and Technology (NIST) (formerly National Bureau of Standards) from 1950 until 1988, when he retired.  He remained a contractor to NIST until his death in 2007.  He was a founder and past president of the International Radiation Physics Society.

He earned a BSE in engineering physics in 1949 and an MS in physics in 1950 from the University of Michigan.

He was author or co-author of over one hundred publications including the "Radiation Physics" article in the 2002 Encyclopedia of Physical Science and Technology.  He was past editor of Applied Radiation and Isotopes and consulting editor of Radiation Physics and Chemistry.

In the scientific community, Mr. Hubbell is known for his evaluations, computations and compilations of photon cross sections and attenuation (and energy-absorption) coefficients used in medicine, engineering and other disciplines. He is also known for his computationally tractable solutions of problems associated with the predictions of radiation fields.

Awards and honors

Faculty Medal, Czech Technical University, 1982
Radiation Industry Award, American Nuclear Society, 1985
Honorary Academician of the International Higher Education Academy of Sciences (Moscow) 1994
Outstanding Alumnus Award, Dept. of Nuclear Engineering, University of Michigan, 1995
Doctor honoris causa, Universidad Nacional de Córdoba, 1996
Elected Fellow of the American Physical Society, 2002.

Publications

Notes

20th-century American physicists
1925 births
2007 deaths
People from Ann Arbor, Michigan
University of Michigan alumni
Fellows of the American Physical Society